DECO Online was a MMORPG developed by  Rocksoft and published in English by JOYMAX Interactive, DECO had no monthly subscription fees and instead the game featured a Microtransaction shop. DECO online closed in December 2010.

Nations
DECO online consists of two nations, Millena and Rain, Millena is a nation that uses weapons such as swords and bows while Rain players use magic.

The Millena race reside in the Millena Town and its surrounding areas, unlike Rain that consists of mountainous regions Millena is surrounded by vast jungles such as Twinible Forest, Forest of Destiny and the Plains of Memory.

Millena players have the choice of becoming a Knight, Mercenary, Slayer or Sniper once they reach level 30. Knights and Mercenaries both use Long Swords, while Slayers use Big Swords. Knights, Mercenaries, and Slayers all use the combo system (C, Z, X) throughout the entire game, while Snipers do not. Snipers are the only job class in Millena that doesn't require the use of the combo system.

However, Snipers have a wider array of skills such as Poison Arrow and more AOEs than any other job class.

Rain's players reside in the mountainous regions of Unicle, the world that DECO Online is based in. Rain is composed of magic users who do not make as much use of the combo system as Millena players do.

References

2008 video games
Massively multiplayer online role-playing games
Video games developed in South Korea
Windows games
Windows-only games